Vernon Norman Kerr (March 11, 1928 – May 28, 2020) was an American politician and scientist who served as a member of the New Mexico House of Representatives.

Early life and education 
Kerr was born in Gallup, New Mexico and graduated from Gallup High School. He received his bachelor's degree in biology and chemistry and his master's degree in organic chemistry from New Mexico Highlands University.

Career 
He was drafted into the United States Army during the Korean War. Kerr worked at the Los Alamos National Laboratory in Los Alamos, New Mexico from 1955 to 1987. He lived with his wife and family in Los Alamos, New Mexico. Kerr served in the New Mexico House of Representatives from 1971 until 1986 and was a Republican. He also served on the Los Alamos County Council. Kerr later served as secretary of the New Mexico Department of Finance.

Death 
Kerr died in Los Alamos, New Mexico at the age of 92.

References

1928 births
2020 deaths
People from Gallup, New Mexico
People from Los Alamos, New Mexico
Military personnel from New Mexico
New Mexico Highlands University alumni
Los Alamos National Laboratory personnel
County commissioners in New Mexico
State cabinet secretaries of New Mexico
Republican Party members of the New Mexico House of Representatives